"Qui est l'exemple?" is a 2001 song recorded by French artists Rohff & Kayliah. It was the third single from his debut album, La Vie avant la mort, and was released in late 2001 in a CD maxi, then in February 2002 in a CD single. It achieved huge success in Belgium (Wallonia), Switzerland and particularly in France where it topped the chart. To date, it is the singer's biggest hit and can be considered as his signature song.

The refrain of the song is sung by Kayliah and contains a sampling of 1981 hit single "Your love" of the band Lime, but plays lower.

As of August 2014, it was the 56th best-selling single of the 21st century in France, with 379,000 units sold.

Track listings
 CD single
 "Qui est l'exemple?" — 3:50
 "Miroir, miroir" — 4:30
 "Qui est l'exemple?" (instrumental) — 3:21
 "Miroir, miroir" - Video

 CD single
 "Qui est l'exemple?" — 3:50
 "Miroir, miroir" — 4:30
 "Qui est l'exemple?" (instrumental) — 3:21
 "Miroir, miroir" (video)

 CD maxi
 "Qui est l'exemple?" — 4:03
 "Miroir, miroir" — 4:34
 "Creuset 2 voyous" — 5:29
 "Qui est l'exemple?" (instrumental) — 3:22
 "Miroir, miroir" (video)

 12" maxi
 "Qui est l'exemple?" — 3:50
 "Qui est l'exemple?" (instrumental) — 3:18
 "Qui est l'exemple?" (a cappella) — 3:50
 "TDSI" — 3:50
 "TDSI" (instrumental) — 3:50

Credits
 Produced by Kore & Skalp
 Vocals by Kayliah

Charts and sales

Peak positions

Year-end charts

Certifications

References

2001 songs
2002 singles
Rohff songs
SNEP Top Singles number-one singles